Daka is a surname  of Zambian origin. Notable people with the surname include:
 John Daka (born 1997), American football linebacker of Zambian descent
 Patrick Daka (born 1975), Zambian footballer
 Patson Daka (born 1998), Zambian footballer
 Peter Daka (born 1960), Zambian politician

Zambian surnames